Holy Trinity Lutheran Church is a Lutheran church in Riga, the capital of Latvia. It is a parish church of the Evangelical Lutheran Church of Latvia. The church is situated at the address 10 Sarkandaugavas Street.

References 

Churches in Riga